Loures—Barbazan station (French: Gare de Loures—Barbazan) is a railway station in Loures-Barousse, Occitanie, France. As its name suggests, the station also served the nearby commune of Barbazan. The station is on the Montréjeau–Luchon railway line.

Train services
Since 18 November 2014, no more trains have called at the station due to poor track infrastructure.

References

Defunct railway stations in Hautes-Pyrénées